Nanfeng Kiln is a tourist attraction in the Ancient Nanfeng Kiln Cultural and Creative Zone, which is located in Shiwan Town, Chancheng District, Foshan city, Guangdong province of China. It was built in the Ming Dynasty Zhengde period (1506–1521), and has been continuously firing Shiwan ware for over 500 years so far.

Introduction
Ancient Nanfeng Kiln is one of the eight attractions of Foshan, as well as a national key cultural relics protection units and AAAA level scenic spots. The main attractions are Shiwan Ceramics Museum, Shiwan Doll Street, International Ceramics Village, Ancient Stove Tree, The Lin's Hall etc., with totally nine blessing spots: the god of fire, Dragon Kiln, Yunyong Pavilion, God Banya, Scholars well, Beidi Temple, Tank Falls, WuDiShengGen, and Lovesickness Desk.

Main facilities
In the old days, the local people recalled Shiwan's kilns as firing ceramics stoves. There are many kinds of kilns, but the most famous ones are dragon kilns, since their shapes look like the huge flying dragon. Ancient Nanfeng Kiln's mouth faces southwards, while banyan trees are clustered at the back of the Furnace, and cold wind will do occur in the summer, therefore, it's called "Nanfeng Kiln".

References 

Chinese pottery kiln sites
Buildings and structures in Foshan
Major National Historical and Cultural Sites in Guangdong